Stanley Fort is a military installation on the south side of Hong Kong Island. Built originally to serve the British Armed Forces, it now houses the Hong Kong garrison of the Chinese People's Liberation Army Ground Force. It has also been used as Kai Chi Children's Centre and the Aberdeen Rehabilitation Centre.

History
The fort, which occupied a site of 128 hectares, was founded in 1841 on the Stanley Peninsula at the southern side of Hong Kong Island. It had barracks and officers quarters. Coastal artillery batteries, such as Stanley Battery and Bluff Head Battery protected the southern approaches. During the Battle of Hong Kong on December 25, 1941, the fort was where British and Canadian troops mounted a final counterattack against Japanese positions at St Stephen's College. The fallen servicemen were buried in the nearby Stanley Military Cemetery.

The fort then became under the control of the Japanese who modified the fort to make it more shell-proof during  the Second World War. In the late 1940s, Stanley Fort reverted to its former purpose as a British Army barracks. By the early 1950s the fort was base of the 27th Heavy Anti-aircraft Regiment and a small workshop operated by the Royal Electrical and Mechanical Engineers. The fort had three-storied barracks, a two-storey NAAFI, medical facilities and a Company HQ building. It also had a parade ground and vehicle and equipment park. In 1997, control was handed to the People's Liberation Army following the Transfer of sovereignty over Hong Kong.

The Stanley Battery Gun Emplacement at Stanley Fort is listed as one of the Grade I historic buildings and thus is protected under the Antiquities and Monuments Ordinance.

See also
 List of Grade I historic buildings in Hong Kong

References

Hong Kong Island
Military of Hong Kong under British rule
Forts in Hong Kong
Stanley, Hong Kong
Grade I historic buildings in Hong Kong